The Representation of the People Act 1985 is an Act of the Parliament of the United Kingdom concerning British electoral law.

The Act allows British citizens who are resident outside the United Kingdom to qualify as "overseas electors" in the constituency for which they were last registered for a period of five years after they have left (this was subsequently changed to 20 years and is now 15 years). Expatriate electors were able to register as overseas electors at British consular posts, starting in the summer of 1986. When registered, expatriate voters were eligible to vote by proxy at any Parliamentary or European Parliament elections which were held after the 1987 register came into force on 16 February 1987. It was estimated that half-a-million British expatriates were enfranchised by the Act.

The Act also made British people abroad on holiday eligible to vote by postal ballot or by proxy, as well as those who were not reasonably expected to be able to by being physically present at the polling station.

The Act modified the rules concerning deposits in Parliamentary elections. Previously the deposit had been £150 and was under this Act raised to £500. The percentage of votes needed to retain the deposit was lowered from 12½% to 5%. The deposit for election to the European Parliament were raised from £600 to £700.

See also 

 Reform Acts
 Representation of the People Act

Notes

External links

United Kingdom Acts of Parliament 1985
Representation of the People Acts